The 2010 Copa Telmex was a men's tennis tournament played on outdoor clay courts. It was the 13th edition of the Copa Telmex, and was part of the ATP World Tour 250 series of the 2010 ATP World Tour. It took place in Buenos Aires, Argentina, from February 15 through February 21, 2010. Juan Carlos Ferrero won the singles title.

The singles line up was led by 2007 Copa Telmex champion and 2009 Copa Telmex runner-up Juan Mónaco, David Ferrer, Nicolás Almagro and Juan Carlos Ferrero. other players were 2008 champion David Nalbandian, Richard Gasquet, Igor Andreev, Albert Montañés.

Finals

Singles

 Juan Carlos Ferrero defeated  David Ferrer 5–7, 6–4, 6–3
It was Ferrero's 2nd title of the year and 14th of his career.

Doubles

 Sebastián Prieto /  Horacio Zeballos defeated  Simon Greul /  Peter Luczak, 7–6(7–4), 6–3

Entrants

Seeds

Rankings as of February 8, 2010.

Other entrants
The following players received wildcards into the main draw:
 Gastón Gaudio
 Carlos Moyá
 Eduardo Schwank

The following players received entry from the qualifying draw:
 Pablo Andújar
 Diego Junqueira
 Santiago Ventura
 Filippo Volandri

The following players received Special Exempts into the main draw:
 Łukasz Kubot
 Ricardo Mello

References

External links
Official website
ITF tournament details

Copa Telmex
ATP Buenos Aires
Copa Telmex
Copa Telmex
2010 Copa Telmex